Paralia (Paralía, meaning "beach") is a tourist seaside settlement and a former municipality in the eastern part of the Pieria regional unit, Greece. Since the 2011 local government reform it is part of the municipality Katerini, of which it is a municipal unit. The seat of the municipality was in Kallithea. The 2011 census reported a population of 1,124 for the village of Paralia, and 6,803 for the municipal unit. The municipal unit has an area of 24.344 km2, the community 1.849 km2. Paralia Katerinis actually translated "Beach of Katerini" and is the closest beach to the capital city of Katerini.

Geography
Paralia is situated on the west coast of the Thermaic Gulf. It lies 2 km east of Kallithea, 5 km south of Korinos and 8 km east of Katerini's city centre. Motorway 1 (served by Katerini's North & South Interchanges) and the Piraeus–Platy railway (served by Katerini RR station) pass west of the settlement. Paralia has a fishing port and the Hellenic Coast Guard Katerini's department.

Historical population

Gallery

See also
List of settlements in the Pieria regional unit

References

External links 
Paraliasummer Tourist guide of Paralia Pieria

Populated places in Pieria (regional unit)
Katerini